"Who's Johnny" is the debut solo single by El DeBarge. Released in 1986 on the Gordy label, the single was used for the film Short Circuit and reached number three on the Billboard Hot 100 and number one on the Hot R&B Singles chart. It was the only solo number 1 single El DeBarge released after he left his surname-based family group, DeBarge, that same year.

The song was parodied by "Weird Al" Yankovic on his album Polka Party! with the song "Here's Johnny".

Music video
The music video features El DeBarge singing in a courtroom, where a judge is presiding over the trial of Johnny 5 (the robotic protagonist of Short Circuit). A representative of NOVA, the government defense contractor that created Johnny, sits at the prosecutor's table as El DeBarge sings his testimony from the witness stand. Stephanie Speck (Ally Sheedy) and a cardboard cutout of Newton Graham Crosby, Ph.D. (Steve Guttenberg) are also in attendance as adversarial witnesses for the prosecution, implying that El Debarge is playing the co-lead role of Ben Jabituya, played by Fisher Stevens in the film. The prosecutor's sole question during these examinations is the titular line of the song "Who's Johnny?" She plays a VHS tape, labeled "Short Circuit", containing various clips from the movie. Meanwhile, Number 5 wreaks havoc in the courtroom (only his robotic hand is visible to the viewer) with various hijinks, including giving the prosecuting attorney a pair of funny nose glasses, turning up the ceiling fan to create a windstorm of papers, swapping the judge's gavel for an exploding one and calling the fire department, resulting in the judge being sprayed with water. Stephanie and El DeBarge sneak out of the courtroom at the end, covering the camera with a slate on their way out. The prosecutor, still wearing the trick glasses, pops up to deliver the last "Who's Johnny?"

Personnel 
 El DeBarge – lead vocals, backing vocals
 Peter Wolf – various instruments, arrangements
 Dann Huff – guitar
 Siedah Garrett – backing vocals
 Phillip Ingram – backing vocals
 Dennis Lambert – backing vocals
 Michael McDonald – backing vocals
 Phil Perry – backing vocals
 Julia Waters – backing vocals
 Oren Waters – backing vocals
 Ina Wolf – backing vocals

Production 
 Peter Wolf – producer
 Brian Malouf – recording, mixing
 Michael Bowman – assistant engineer
 Dan Garcia – assistant engineer
 Stephen Krause – assistant engineer

Charts

Weekly charts

Year-end charts

References

DeBarge songs
1986 songs
1986 debut singles
Songs written by Peter Wolf (producer)
RPM Top Singles number-one singles
Gordy Records singles